The Archaic Course is the third studio album by Norwegian heavy metal band Borknagar. It is the first album to feature Simen "ICS Vortex" Hestnæs on vocals following the departure of Kristoffer "Garm" Rygg (who, according to Øystein Brun, "didn't want to scream anymore"), and the first with guitarist Jens F. Ryland. The album also features contributions from Enslaved guitarist Ivar Bjørnson, although he was not credited as part of the band in the album's liner notes. This is also the last album to feature drummer and founding member Erik "Grim" Brødreskift, who died of a deliberate drug overdose shortly after its release.

Track listing

Personnel
Borknagar
Simen Hestnæs (credited as "ICS Vortex") – vocals, synthesizer and sound effects (on "Ad Noctum")
Øystein G. Brun – electric guitar
Jens F. Ryland – electric guitar
Kai K. Lie – bass
Erik Brødreskift (credited as "Grim") – drums, percussion
Ivar Bjørnson – synthesizer and sound effects (all tracks, except "Ad Noctum")

Additional personnel
Christophe Szpajdel – logo

References

External links
Borknagar-The Archaic Course (1998 3rd Album at Borknagar.com)

Borknagar albums
1998 albums
Century Media Records albums